Lambert is a town in Alfalfa County, Oklahoma, United States. The population was six at the 2010 census.

History
The town of Lambert was named after Ambrose Lambert, who owned the original townsite.  Lambert is contiguous to the similar small community of Yewed directly to its east.  Part of the area known as the Cherokee Outlet, Lambert was originally part of Woods County after 1893 until the time of statehood in 1907, when the area became part of newly formed Alfalfa County.

The Choctaw Northern railway (later owned by the Chicago, Rock Island and Pacific
), which in 1901 became the county's first railroad, connected Lambert to the other Alfalfa county towns of Aline, Augusta, Ingersoll, Driftwood, Amorita, and on into Kansas.  Lambert had a U.S. Post Office beginning in November 21, 1901 and remaining open until April 30, 1952.

By 1909, Lambert had 127 inhabitants and four churches, a hotel, a bank, an elevator, and two grain buyers.  In addition, a half-dozen stores served the local community.  Its population peaked in 1920 at 130, and by 2010 it had only 6 remaining residents.

Distinctions
 Lambert's Farmers' Bank had the peculiar distinction of having been robbed twice, first in 1904 and then again in 1919.
 Newbery Medal-winning author (1958) and Oklahoma Sports Hall of Fame inductee (1987), Harold Keith was born in Lambert on April 8, 1903.

Geography
Lambert is located at  (36.6830868, -98.4231315).

Lambert is not served by the Oklahoma state highway system.

Demographics

As of the census of 2000, there were 9 people, 4 households, and 4 families residing in the town. There were 6 housing units at an average density of 52.2 per square mile (21.1/km2). The racial makeup of the town was 100.00% White.

There were 4 households, out of which 25.0% had children under the age of 18 living with them, 50.0% were married couples living together, 25.0% had a female householder with no husband present, and 0.0% were non-families. No households were made up of individuals, and none had someone living alone who was 65 years of age or older. The average household size was 2.25 and the average family size was 2.25.

In the town, the population was spread out, with 11.1% under the age of 18, 22.2% from 25 to 44, 33.3% from 45 to 64, and 33.3% who were 65 years of age or older. The median age was 58 years. For every 100 females, there were 125.0 males. For every 100 females age 18 and over, there were 166.7 males.

The median income for a household in the town was $31,250, and the median income for a family was $31,250. Males had a median income of $23,750 versus $0 for females. The per capita income for the town was $16,144. None of the population and none of the families were below the poverty line.

Notable person
 Novelist and University of Oklahoma sports director Harold Keith was born in Lambert.

References

External links
 Encyclopedia of Oklahoma History and Culture - Lambert

Towns in Alfalfa County, Oklahoma
Towns in Oklahoma